New York's 150th State Assembly district is one of the 150 districts in the New York State Assembly. It has been represented by Andy Goodell since 2011.

Geography
District 150 contains the entirety of Chautauqua County. Following redistricting in 2021, the Cattaraugus Reservation in Erie County was added.

Recent election results

2022

2020

2018

2016

2014

2012

2010

References

150
Chautauqua County, New York